Qashqari may refer to anything coming from or related to:
 Kashgar, an oasis city in Chinese Turkestan
 Qashqari, a type of rubab, a stringed musical instrument
 Chitral, a city and region in northern Pakistan
Kho people, an ethnic group of Chitral
Khowar language, the Dardic language spoken by them
 Neel Kashkari, a U.S. Federal Reserve Bank president